Digitivalva trapezopa is a moth of the family Acrolepiidae. It is known from South Africa.

References

Endemic moths of South Africa
Acrolepiidae
Moths of Africa
Moths described in 1914